Väderöarna (or the Weather Islands) is an archipelago in Western Sweden, near Hamburgsund. There is a large colony of seals living on the islands.

Location and geography 

The Väderöarna Islands are located in Skagerrak near the North Sea. Many of the islands are small, hilly, and roadless.

There is one accommodation on the islands. Lighthouses on the islands are also available for rent.

Transportation 

The Väderöarnas are accessible by a 30-minute boat ride from Fjällbacka.

References 

Archipelagoes of Sweden
Landforms of Västra Götaland County